Francis Willis may refer to:

 Francis Willis (academic) (died 1597), English academic administrator at the University of Oxford and Dean of Worcester
 Francis Willis (physician) (1718–1807), British physician and clergyman, known for his treatment of George III
 Francis Willis (Representative) (1745–1829), United States Representative from Georgia

See also
 Frank Willis (disambiguation)
 Frances E. Willis (1899–1983), third woman to enter the U.S. Foreign Service